Ourso is a surname, a spelling variant of Urso under French influence. Notable people with the surname include:

Darrell Ourso
Jessel Ourso

See also

References